Lake Wallula is a reservoir on the Columbia River in the United States, between the U.S. states of Washington and Oregon. It was created in 1954 with the construction of McNary Dam. It reaches from McNary Dam near the city of Umatilla, Oregon, to the Tri-Cities of Washington.

See also
 Wallula Gap
 List of lakes in Oregon
 List of hydroelectric dams on the Columbia River

References

 

Bodies of water of Benton County, Washington
Columbia River
Bodies of water of Franklin County, Washington
Reservoirs in Washington (state)
Reservoirs in Oregon
Lakes of Umatilla County, Oregon
Bodies of water of Walla Walla County, Washington
1954 establishments in Oregon